The 2020 Women's under-19 World Floorball Championships was the 9th world championships in women's under-19 floorball and held on 1 to 5 September 2021 in Uppsala, Sweden. Originally scheduled to take place on 6 to 10 May 2020, but due to the COVID-19 pandemic in Sweden, it was rescheduled to 2021.

Finland won their second World Championship ever and the first World Championship since 9 years. In the final Finland won host team Sweden on overtime 5–4. Czech Republic won bronze medal over Switzerland with numbers 6–2.

Qualification

Venues

Tournament groups
After the group ballot, 9 teams are divided into 2 groups. In the group stage each team plays each other once, while the second stage of the event includes play-offs and placement matches.
The two best teams of group A and B go directly to the semi-final.

Preliminary round

Group A

All times are local (UTC+2).

Group B

All times are local (UTC+2).

Placement round

7th–9th place game

Seventh place game

Russia vs Slovakia

Eighth place game

Russia vs Germany

Fifth place game

Poland vs Latvia

Knock-out stage

Bracket

Semifinals

Czech Republic vs Finland

Switzerland vs Sweden

Bronze medal game

Gold medal game

Final standings

References

External links
 Official Website

Floorball World Championships
2021 in floorball
International floorball competitions hosted by Sweden
World Floorball Championships
World Floorball Champions